Jolgeh Rural District is in the Central District of Behabad County, Yazd province, Iran. At the National Census of 2006, its population was 3,785 in 946 households, when it was in Behabad District of Bafq County. There were 3,422 inhabitants in 1,025 households at the following census of 2011, by which time the district had been elevated to the status of a county. At the most recent census of 2016, the population of the rural district was 4,160 in 1,253 households. The largest of its 72 villages was Ahmadabad, with 1,260 people.

References 

Behabad County

Rural Districts of Yazd Province

Populated places in Yazd Province

Populated places in Behabad County